Taj Mohammed (born 1924, date of death unknown) was an Indian footballer who played for then Calcutta Football League side East Bengal. He competed in the men's tournament at the 1948 Summer Olympics.

Playing career
Mohammed began his club football career in 1948 at Calcutta Football League club East Bengal. He along with Muhammad Umer, appeared with Karachi-based National Football Championship club Friends Union in 1953–54, and also captained the team.

After representing India at international level, he migrated to Pakistan and went on to play for the Pakistan national football team at the Quadrangular Tournament in 1953 in Rangoon. They finished as runners-up in that tournament, as India won title. He was also a member of Pakistan team that toured to Iran and Iraq in the 1950s.

Honours
Bengal
 Santosh Trophy: 1945–46
East Bengal
 IFA Shield: 1949
 Calcutta Football League: 1949
 Rovers Cup: 1949

Pakistan
 Colombo Cup runner-up: 1953

See also

 List of Indian football players in foreign leagues
 List of association footballers who have been capped for two senior national teams
 India–Pakistan football rivalry

References

Bibliography

External links
 

1924 births
Year of death missing
Footballers from Quetta
Indian footballers
India international footballers
Indian expatriate footballers
Expatriate footballers in Pakistan
Olympic footballers of India
Footballers at the 1948 Summer Olympics
Place of birth missing
Association football defenders
East Bengal Club players
Pakistani footballers
Pakistan international footballers
Dual internationalists (football)
Pakistani expatriate footballers
Expatriate footballers in India
Calcutta Football League players